Mattia Altobelli (born 17 August 1983) is a professional Italian footballer who plays as a striker.

Football career
Son of the striker Alessandro Altobelli, he started his career at Internazionale where he won the league title with Primavera Reserve team in 2002. He made his Inter first team debut against A.S. Bari in the Coppa Italia on 4 December 2002.

In summer 2003, being too old for the youth team (U-20), he was loaned to sister club Spezia at Serie C1 along with Mathieu Moreau.

He then moved to SPAL of Serie C1 in August 2004, and then loaned to newly promoted Serie B team Avellino in July 2005.

After spent on loan at Sassari Torres at the second half of 2005/06 season, he was transferred to Chiasso of Swiss Challenge League, where he rejoined former youth teammate Wellington.

In summer 2007, Altobelli transferred to newly promoted Serie C1 team Lecco.

In January 2009, he was loaned to Pro Vercelli. and in January 2010 left for Rodengo Saiano.

References

External links
Inter Archive
 
 Profile at Associazione Italiana Calciatori (data by football.it) 

Italian footballers
Italian expatriate footballers
Inter Milan players
Spezia Calcio players
S.P.A.L. players
U.S. Avellino 1912 players
FC Chiasso players
Calcio Lecco 1912 players
A.C. Rodengo Saiano players
F.C. Pro Vercelli 1892 players
Serie B players
Serie C players
Swiss Challenge League players
Expatriate footballers in Switzerland
Italian expatriate sportspeople in Switzerland
Association football forwards
Footballers from Brescia
1983 births
Living people